Richard Wilfred Godfrey (12 September 1888 – 24 April 1972) was an Australian rules footballer who played with Richmond in the Victorian Football League (VFL).

Notes

External links 

1888 births
1972 deaths
Australian rules footballers from Melbourne
Richmond Football Club players
Hawthorn Football Club (VFA) players
People from North Melbourne